Lembolovo is a rural locality in Vsevolozhsky District of Leningrad Oblast, Russia, located on the Karelian Isthmus.

Transportation
It has a station on the Saint Petersburg-Hiitola railroad.

Rural localities in Leningrad Oblast
Sankt-Peterburgsky Uyezd
Karelian Isthmus